The 2017–18 Toto Cup Leumit is the 28th season of the second tier League Cup (as a separate competition) since its introduction. It is divided into two stages. First, sixteen Liga Leumit teams were divided into four regionalized groups, with the winners and runners-up advanced to the quarter-finals. Quarter-finals, semi-finals and the final are due to be held as one-legged matches.

The defending cup holders, Maccabi Sha'arayim, are not competing in this edition, as the club was relegated to Liga Alef at the end of the previous season.

In the final, played on 6 December 2017, Hapoel Afula defeated Hapoel Ramat Gan 3–0.

Group stage
Groups were allocated according to geographic distribution of the clubs. The groups were announced by the IFA on took place on 29 June 2017.

Tiebreakers
If two or more teams are equal on points on completion of the group matches, the following criteria are applied to determine the rankings.
 Superior goal difference
 Higher number of victories achieved
 Higher number of goals scored
 Higher number of points obtained in the group matches played among the teams in question
 Superior goal difference from the group matches played among the teams in question
 Higher number of victories achieved in the group matches played among the teams in question
 Higher number of goals scored in the group matches played among the teams in question
 A deciding match, if needed to set which team qualifies to the quarter-finals.

Group A

Group B

Group C

Group D

Knockout rounds
All times are in Israel Standard Time

Quarter-finals
The draw was held on 22 August 2017.

Semi-finals

Final

See also
 2017–18 Toto Cup Al
 2017–18 Liga Leumit
 2017–18 Israel State Cup

References

External links
 Official website 

Leumit
Toto Cup Leumit
Toto Cup Leumit